The Colombian salsa band Grupo Niche made 16 albums between 1979 and 1999. The album that reached the highest position in the Tropical Albums chart was Cielo de Tambores, which attained 3rd place in 1990.

Studio albums

1970s

1980s

1990s

References 

Discographies of Colombian artists
Tropical music discographies